Tholkappiyan Thirumavalavan (born 17 August 1962), better known as Thol. Thirumavalavan is a political leader, scholar and activist from the southern Indian state of Tamil Nadu. He is a Member of Parliament from Chidambaram. Founder and President of Viduthalai Chiruthaigal Katchi. He rose to prominence in the 1990s as a Dalit leader, and formally entered politics in 1999. His political platform centres on ending caste-based discrimination and consequently the caste system. He has also expressed support for Tamil nationalist movements in Sri Lanka.

He contested the 1999 and 2004 general elections unsuccessfully and won the 2009 general elections from the Chidambaram constituency. He won the 2001 state assembly elections in alliance with Dravida Munnetra Kazhagam, a post from which he resigned in 2004 quoting ideological differences with DMK. He is an author, and has also acted in Tamil cinema.

His confrontation with Pattali Makkal Katchi and its leader Ramadoss has resulted in frequent clashes between Dalits and the Vanniyars. Both parties have accused each other of instigating violence against the other community. Both Thirumavalavan and Ramadoss reconciled their differences and worked together during the period of 2004 to 2009, when they were part of the same electoral alliance.

In 2019 Thirumavalavan regained his Chidambaram seat and has been a vocal Opposition MP. In 2021, he led his party to win 4 seats in the Tamil Nadu legislative assembly.

Early life 
Thirumavalavan was born on 17 August 1962 in Anganur (a village in present-day Ariyalur district of Tamil Nadu) as the son of Periyammal and Tholkappiyan.

Education 
He did his Bachelor's course in Chemistry at Presidency college Chennai, Master's degree in Criminology and pursued Law at Madras Law College. He completed his Ph.D. at Manonmanium Sundaranar University and was awarded his doctorate in 2018.

Career 
He worked in the government's Forensic Department as a scientific assistant, from which he later resigned in 1999 to contest polls.

Early activism
When he was studying at Madras Law College, Thirumavalavan got interested in the Eelam movement, due to Suba Veerapandian (who conducted a guest lecture on the topic). Thirumavalavan later met Suba Veerapandian again in September 1990 at Periyar Thidal (headquarters of the Dravidar Kazhagam).

In 1988, when working for the government's Forensic Department in the southern city of Madurai, he met Malaichamy, the Tamil Nadu state convenor of the Dalit Panthers Iyyakkam (DPI), an organisation that fought for the rights of Dalits. Following Malaichamy's death, Thirumalavan was elected the leader of the DPI on 21 January 1990. He designed a new flag for the organisation and changed its name to Viduthalai Chiruthaigal (Liberation Panthers). As part of his work, he also began visiting Dalit villages in the Madurai region, and began learning about the problems faced by Dalits. The killing of two Dalits in 1992, he says, made him more militant. He was particularly noted for his aggressive speeches which gained him significant recognition. Against the background of increasing Dalit assertiveness, he emerged as one of two major Dalit leaders in Tamil Nadu, with a large base of grassroots support, particularly in the southern districts of Tamil Nadu. During early 1997, he was suspended from his government job on account of his increased political activity. He resigned from his job formally in August 1999 to contest the 1999 Indian general elections.

Political career

The DPI boycotted elections until 1999 general elections. It is unclear why the party did not contest elections until 1999. The decision of contesting the election in 1999 was considered controversial within the party. Thirumavalavan allied with G. K. Moopanar's Tamil Maanila Congress and represented the Third Front. The party contested in the Parliamentary constituencies of Chidambaram and Perambalur. Thirumavalavan contested in Chidambaram, and managed to poll 225,000 votes in his debut elections. Thirumavalavan alleged in one of his interviews on 22 February 2000 that the opposing DMK administration used National Goonda Act and National Security Act to detain cadres of his party. The phase also culminated the rivalry between Thirumavalavan's party and his competitors in the Chidambaram Constituency, the Pattali Makkal Katchi (PMK). PMK is a party that has a strong presence in the northern districts of Tamil Nadu. The election in the constituency was marked by violence from both the parties. Houses of Dalits were burnt and Dalits in the region were denied employment, while Vanniyar houses were also burnt.

In 2001 state elections Viduthalai Chiruthaigal allied with the Dravida Munnetra Kazhagam and contested seven seats. Since the PMK joined the AIADMK alliance, the VCK had to join the DMK led alliance. There were ideological differences in the alliance as it had BJP, which was earlier criticised by Thirumavalavan. Thirumavalavan was elected from Mangalore Constituency to State Legislative Assembly. During the 2004 general elections, he resigned his MLA post on 3 February 2004 quoting humiliation meted out by the alliance partners, especially the DMK. He also quoted that he quit as he contested in the symbol of DMK during the 2001 assembly elections. Thirumavalavan contested once again from Chidambaram in 2004 general elections, this time with Janata Dal (United) and polled 257,000 votes and lost by a low margin.

During 2004, after efforts from N. Sethuraman from MMK, Thirumavalavan and Ramadoss, the leader of PMK joined hands through a Tamil protection movement named Tamil Paathukappu Iyakkam.
He joined the All India Anna Dravida Munnetra Kazhagam (AIADMK) alliance in the 2006 elections to the Tamil Nadu Legislative Assembly. His party was recognised by the Election Commission of India as a registered political party on 2 March 2006. Viduthalai Chiruthaigal Katchi contested in nine seats in Tamil Nadu and 2 seats in Pondicherry. The party won two of them, namely Durai Ravikumar from Kattumannarkoil, and Selvaperunthagai from Mangalore constituency. The alliance with ADMK broke in 2006, when he started allying with the DMK. His party contested in the local bodies elections in DMK alliance in 2006 and won five chairman to various municipalities. In the 2009 general election, Thirumavalavan allied with DMK and was elected to Parliament from the Chidhambaram Lok Sabha constituency in his third attempt.

Elections contested and positions held

   2001: Elected to Tamil Nadu Legislative Assembly for the first time.
   May 2009: Elected to Lok Sabha (fifteenth) for the first time
   May 2019: Elected to Lok Sabha 17th for the second time
   31 August 2009:Member of committee on commerce and member of consultative committee on ministry of social justice and empowerment.

Political views
Thirumalavan's politics are grounded in Ambedkarite and Dravidian philosophies as well as a retheorization of Tamil nationalism, which seeks to turn it into a force for annihilation of the caste system. Oppression of Dalits, he says, is institutionalised in India, including Tamil Nadu. Although the Dravidian parties which dominate the politics of Tamil Nadu are ideologically committed to the eradication of the caste system, Thirumavalavan argues that they have in practice drifted away from the original ideals of the Dravidian movement. Their policies, he says, have mainly benefitted the middle castes, and had actually led to an increase in the oppression of Dalits, with the middle castes replacing the Brahmins as the oppressor. Dalits cannot and should not expect much help from the Dravidian parties. The solution, according to Thirumavalavan, lies in Tamil nationalism. Caste oppression, he says, can only be ended by building resistance from below, through appealing to Tamil sentiments, as happened in the early days of the Dravidian movement under Periyar E. V. Ramasamy. If a properly Tamil government is formed in Tamil Nadu, he says, caste oppression will immediately disappear.

Thirumavalavan's views on the importance of the Tamil identity have also led him to strongly support Tamil secessionist groups in Sri Lanka, including the Liberation Tigers of Tamil Eelam, a militant secessionist group who are formally banned as a terrorist organisation in India. He has criticised India for assisting the Sri Lankan army during the Sri Lankan military operations against the LTTE in 2008 and 2009, and has called upon the government of Tamil Nadu to take steps to safeguard the Tamils of Sri Lanka. On 15 January 2009 he started a hunger fast near Chennai (Maraimalai Adigal Nagar) for the cause of Sri Lankan Tamils. After four days, on 19 January he called off the fast, saying that it had had no effect on the Indian government, and calling for a hartal in its place. He was a part of the 10 member MP team that visited the war-affected areas and transitional centres in Vavuniya on 11 October 2009. The delegation visited various part of Jaffna district and had a meeting at the Jaffna public library.

Thirumavalvan has also severely criticised Hindu society for, in his views, being built on the basis of caste and obeying the Manusmriti.

Dr. Thirumalavan is also a staunch critic of Hindu nationalism and, in particular, Hindutva. Hindutva, to Thirumavalavan, is the essence of the oppressive Indian state. Hindutva, he argues, has through religion worked to homogenise Tamil society with that of northern India. This, he says, has led to Tamils losing their identity. Ethnic Tamil nationalism, in his view, is essential to combat Hindutva. In more recent years his politics have mainly revolved around opposing the BJP and RSS in their agenda, including the controversial Citizenship Amendment Act. He views Hindutva organizations and ideology as being against the ideas of secularism and social justice. To him the idea of a Hindu Rashtra goes against the Indian constitution and would lead to continuation of caste hierarchies as part of "Sanatana Dharma". He believes Sanatan Dharma rejects equality, freedom and brotherhood. He says that Sanatana forces wanted to divide people on religious lines to implement Manu Dharma.

In 2009, Tamil Nadu's chief minister M. Karunanidhi passed a resolution in principle for 3% inner reservation for Arunthathiyar community, which Thirumavalavan supported.

In 2021, he claimed that it is his policy to expose to people, the intentions of the BJP which seeks to gain political advantage by cultivating casteism in Tamil soil, inciting religious hatred and division.

Film career 
Thirumavalavan played a guest appearance as a Tamil militant leader in Sri Lanka in his first film Anbu Thozhi (2007), directed by L. G. Ravichandran. Thirumavalavan was cast in the leading role of a film titled Kalaham to play the character of Balasingham, a law college professor, which was being directed by Kalanjiyam. The film later failed to materialize. He also appeared in a song in Mansoor Ali Khan's Ennai Paar Yogam Varum (2007). In 2011, he played the role of the Chief Minister in Minsaram.

Filmography

Works 
Thiruma's books 
 
 Aththumeeru (Transgress), Tamizhargal Hindukkala? (Are the Tamils, Hindus?)
 Eelam Enral Puligal, Puligal Enral Eelam (Eelam means Tigers, Tigers means Eelam)
 Hindutuvathai Veraruppom (We Shall Uproot Hindutva) 
 Saadhiya Sandharpavaadha Aniyai Veezhtuvom (We Shall Defeat the Casteist Opportunist Alliance). 
 Two of his books have been published in English by Stree-Samya Books, Kolkata: Talisman: Extreme Emotions of Dalit Liberation (political essays written for 34 weeks in the India Today magazine's Tamil edition) and Uproot Hindutva: The Fiery Voice of the Liberation Panthers (contains 12 of his speeches). 
 In 2018, he released a book Amaipai Thiralvom based on his political experiences which received warm welcome, positive reviews and also criticism from various Intellectual sources

Controversies
In the northern districts of Tamil Nadu with a large Vanniyar population, there are frequent clashes between Dalits and Vanniyars. During the 1999 general elections, there was intense violence in the region with casualties on both sides. Thirumavalavan accused Pattali Makkal Katchi, a Vanniyar caste-based party and its founder Ramadoss of instigating violence among the Vanniyars that result in the attack of Dalits. While Ramadoss alleges that Thirumavalavan encourages his party men to have sham inter-caste love marriage, Thirumavalavan accuses Ramadoss of showing caste superiority and instigating violence against Dalits. Both Thirumavalavan and Ramadoss reconciled and worked together during the period of 2004 to 2009, when they were part of the same electoral alliance. After 2009, when PMK split out of the DMK combine, the mutual confrontation started again.

During December 2012, Ramadoss formed an all community safeguard forum comprising 51 intermediate castes. He said he would not have any further alliance with Thirumavalavan and his party. He alleged that the Dalits take undue advantage over other communities using the SC/ST Prevention of Atrocities Act and the Act should be abolished. During April 2013, after the party conference of PMK in Mahabalipuram, there were widespread attacks on the Dalits in Dharmapuri district that resulted in two Dalits being killed. Both PMK and VCK accused each other for the mishap, but Ramadoss was arrested after the orders from the state government for the hate speech and damages to the state property during the violence. Thirumavalavan accused Ramadoss that his loss in the electoral base after the 2009 general elections and 2011 assembly elections has resulted in his going back to instigating caste violence.

The BSP was floated in Tamil Nadu in December 2008 with the same ideology as in Uttar Pradesh to unite the Dalits and Brahmins. Some of the prominent members of VCK like Selvaperunthagai, who was a MLA in Mangalore constituency, joined BSP. Thirumavalavan, in his response, claimed that the BSP is no threat to VCK vote bank and that the BSP has dumped the principles of Ambedkar, Kanshi Ram and Periyar. Some of the senior journalists also believed that BSP will not have a firm hold in Tamil Nadu to garner the 19% Dalit vote bank in Tamil Nadu as it did in Uttar Pradesh, as the vote bank is already split by the VCK and Puthia Tamizhagam party.

The VCK, in a plan to start a television channel, asked the party men to donate gold on the occasion of the 50th birthday of Thirumavalavan. There were also Thulabaram type of functions where equal weight of Thirmavalavan was donated. This was subject to wider criticism, drawing parallels with the exotic celebrations organised by Mayawati, the leader of BSP in Uttar Pradesh. Thirumavalavan clarified that the idea was to collect donations for the party and that his party did not enjoy support from rich people as with the case of other parties. As of 4 October 2012, the party got  of gold from seven centres that included Puducherry that had .

An altered video of a webinar from September 2020 in which Thol. Thirumavalavan was mentioning certain portions from Manusmriti on the status of women and their role created a controversy where he allegedly said that the Manusmriti treated all women as prostitutes. As soon as the video gained steam, BJP members condemned the his statements and claimed that Thirumavalavan had insulted women by referring to them as prostitutes. Thirumavalavan, however, claimed that he was not demeaning women but emancipating them and that he was merely quoting great leaders. The Chennai city police registered a case against Thirumavalavan for over his comment on Manusmriti on 23 October 2020, based on a complaint by BJP legal cell state secretary. The VCK cadre across Tamil Nadu staged protests, after the call for protests by Thirumavalavan urging the state and union government to ban Manusmriti on 24 October 2020 saying that the Manusmriti degrades Dalits, indigenous people, women and backward castes and spreads hate on them. During the protests, he claimed that a few groups edited out five minutes from the forty minute video and claimed that he was demeaning women and the Hindutva groups are circulating the false message against him.

Notes

References

External links 
 Viduthalai Chiruthaigal Katchi
 Thirumavalavan elected VCK president
 Thirumavalavan not to contest polls
 Thirumavalavan invites minorities
 Official facebook

Tamil Nadu politicians
Living people
India MPs 2009–2014
Tamil male actors
Dalit activists
Lok Sabha members from Tamil Nadu
People from Ariyalur district
1962 births
Activists from Tamil Nadu
Indian actor-politicians
Indian Tamil politicians
Tamil Maanila Congress politicians
Dravida Munnetra Kazhagam politicians
Janata Dal (United) politicians
Viduthalai Chiruthaigal Katchi politicians
Dalit politicians
India MPs 2019–present